Proteracanthus sarissophorus is a species of ephippid native to coral reefs around Malaysia, Borneo, and Sumatra. This species grows to a length of  SL.  This species is the only known member of its genus.

References

Ephippidae
Taxa named by Albert Günther
Monotypic marine fish genera